Ei8ht may refer to:
 Ei8ht (album), Nik Kershaw's eighth album
 Ei8ht: The Power of Shani, a 2006 Hindi horror film